Catherine Svarc (born 25 November 1991) is an Australian rules footballer playing for Brisbane in the AFL Women's competition (AFLW). 

Svarc is from Corowa, New South Wales and grew up on a farm with younger sister Ruby Svarc in a family passionate about Australian rules. Cathy played competitive netball before moving to Geelong to become a physiotherapist.

Svarc made her debut in the Lions' round 1 game against  at Hickey Park on 8 February 2020.

References

External links
 

1991 births
Living people
Sportswomen from Queensland
Australian rules footballers from Queensland
Brisbane Lions (AFLW) players